Włodzimierz Wolski (9 October 1824, Pultusk – 29 July 1882, Brussels) was a Polish poet, novelist, translator, and librettist. He is best known as the author of the libretto to Stanisław Moniuszko's opera Halka.

He grew up in Warsaw and published his poems and prose in magazines there. He took part in the January Uprising and settled in Brussels after the defeat.

Works
Poetry
 Ojciec Hilary (Father Hillary)
 Halka
 Połośka
 Śpiewy powstańcze (Songs of Insurgents)
 Promyki (Rays)
 Listy z Belgii (Letters from Belgium)
Librettos
 Halka
 The Countess
 Połośka gwinciarska

References
 Zofia Lewinówna, Literatura polska. Przewodnik encyklopedyczny, Volume II, Warsaw 1985, p. 624.

Polish male poets
Polish male novelists
Polish translators
Opera librettists
1824 births
1882 deaths
19th-century translators
19th-century Polish poets
19th-century Polish novelists
19th-century Polish dramatists and playwrights
19th-century Polish male writers
Polish male dramatists and playwrights
People from Pułtusk